A park is an area of land with a recreational or other specific purpose.

Park or Parks may also refer to:

Places

United Kingdom 
 Park (Reading ward), an electoral ward of the Borough of Reading, Berkshire, England
 Park (Sefton ward), an electoral ward of the Borough of Sefton, Merseyside, England
 Park (Tunbridge Wells), a local government ward in Tunbridge Wells, Kent, England
 Park (Wolverhampton ward), an electoral ward of Wolverhampton City Council, West Midlands, England
 Park, County Londonderry, a village in Northern Ireland
 Park, Lewis, an area of land in the Outer Hebrides, Scotland 
 Park, Merthyr Tydfil, a community and electoral ward in Wales
 Park, a townland in County Antrim, Northern Ireland
 The Parks, a parkland area and cricket venue in Oxford, England

United States 
 Park, Indiana
 Park, Kansas
 Park, Kentucky
 Park, Texas
 Park, Washington
 Parks, Arizona, a census-designated place
 Parks, Louisiana, a village
 Parks, Missouri, a ghost town
 Parks, Nebraska, an unincorporated community
 Sly Park, California, formerly called Park, California

Elsewhere 
 Park, Afghanistan
 Park, a townland in County Laois, Ireland
 Park, Warmian-Masurian Voivodeship, Poland
 Park, Yazd, Iran
 5585 Parks, an asteroid
 Park Abbey, Belgium

People

As a surname
 Park (Korean surname)
 Park (English surname)
 Parks (surname)

As a given name
 Park Laurie (in full James Park Dawson Laurie, 1846–1928), South Australian politician

Fictional characters 
 Chi Park, a character from the American medical drama TV series House
 Chyna, Cameron, and Daryl Parks from the American teen sitcom A.N.T. Farm
 Helen Park, a character from the 2020 video game Call of Duty: Black Ops Cold War
 Ricky "Jupe" Park, a character from the 2022 science fiction horror film Nope
 Willow Park, a character from the 2020 animated fantasy series The Owl House
 Zane Park, a character from the Canadian teen drama Degrassi: The Next Generation

Arts, entertainment, and media

Films
 Park (2007 film), an American romantic comedy film starring William Baldwin and Cheri Oteri
 Park (2016 film), a Greek-Polish film

Music
 Park (album), the sixth album from The Mad Capsule Markets
 Park (band), an American punk rock band
 Park Records, a record label

Brands and enterprises 
 Park, a brand of amplifiers built by Jim Marshall of Marshall Amplification, 1965–1982
 Park Tool Company, a manufacturer of professional bicycle tools

Vehicles 
 Parking
 Parking pawl, the park position of an automatic transmission

Other uses 
 Parks College, Oxford, a proposed graduate college of the University of Oxford
 Pärk, a game somewhat similar to baseball from the island of Gotland in Baltic Sea
 Park, a 6-row malting barley variety
 Parks (board game)
 Types of places called "park(s)":
 Amusement park
 Baseball park, also ballpark or diamond, a type of sporting venue where baseball is played
 Business park, or office park, an area allocated for the development and operation of office buildings and light industry
 Car park, or parking lot
 Deer park (England), a protected living space for deer
 Industrial park, an area allocated for industrial development, typically that of heavy industry rather than light industry
 Involuntary park, an area formerly inhabited or developed by humans that has since fallen into disuse, permitting for reclamation by plants and animals
 Landscape park (protected area), a protected area of lower status than a national park
 National park, a reserve of land protected from most human development and pollution
 Science park
 Skatepark

See also 

 
 The Park (disambiguation)
 Park Avenue (disambiguation)
 Park City (disambiguation)
 Park County (disambiguation)
 Park Hotel (disambiguation)
 Parkland (disambiguation)
 Park Road (disambiguation)
 Park Township (disambiguation)
 Parke (disambiguation)
 Parkes (disambiguation)
 Parker (disambiguation)